The Rein da Maighels is one of the main tributaries of the Rhine (see Sources of the Rhine) and is a tributary to the Rein da Curnera.  The firm Kraftwerke Vorderrhein AG has built a hydropower dam creating a reservoir, called the Lai da Curnera, into which both rivers now flow.

The origin of the Rein da Maighels is the Maghels Glacier on the Piz Ravetsch near the point where the cantons of Graubünden, Ticino and Uri meet.  From the glacier, the Rein da Maighels flows north, through the Val da Maighels, then east, through Val Platta''' between Piz Cavradi and Piz Piogn Crap, then into Val Curnera'' and into the Lai da Curnera reservoir.

Rivers of Switzerland
Rivers of Graubünden
Tujetsch